The Faculty of Indigenous Medicine of the University of Colombo, specialising in Ayurveda and the Sri Lankan traditional medicine. Founded as the College of Indigenous Medicine in 1929, it became part of the University of Colombo adopting its current name in 1977. It is a premier center of undergraduate and postgraduate study and research into Ayurveda and Indigenous Medicine and Healthcare.

History

IIM was first established as the Swadeshiya Vaidya Vidyalaya (College of Indigenous Medicine) on June 10, 1929 and it was inaugurated by the then Governor of Ceylon, Sir Herbert James Stanley, at the Bauer Building situated at Cotta Road, Borella.  Captain (Dr) A.N.N Panikker of the Indian Medical Service who had qualified in western medicine in Edinburgh and possessed a sound training in Ayurveda sciences was invited to the newly established College by the Government as its first principal. Similarly, Dr H.M. Jaffer and Dr H. Ahamed were also brought down from India to develop Unani system of medicine.

In 1961, the Ayurveda Act No. 31 of 1961 was enacted by repealing the Indigenous Medical Ordinance No. 17 of 1941 and the college was renamed as the Government College of Indigenous Medicine and came under the management of the College and Hospital Board. This was a step taken to uphold the quality of ayurveda healthcare delivery and the systems of education in Ayurveda, Unani and Siddha.

In 1977, the College of Indigenous Medicine was renamed as the Institute of Indigenous Medicine and affiliated to the University of Colombo under the University Act No. 1 of 1972. This was done by the Institute of Ayurveda Statute No. 1 of 1977, published in the Government Gazette Extraordinary bearing number 258 of March 30, 1977.  The objective of this step was to produce qualified medical practitioners in the field of Ayurveda, Unani and Siddha medical systems. Institute of Indigenous Medicine Ordinance No. 7 of 1979 published in the Government Gazettee Extraordinary bearing No. 67/14 dated December 21, 1979 under the Universities Act No. 16 of 1978.  With this enactment, the Siddha section was transferred and affiliated to the University of Jaffna.

The Faculty of Indigenous Medicine of the University of Colombo was established by an order of Gazette Extraordinary No 2319/22 – Wednesday, February 13, 2023, as the 10th Faculty of the University effective on the 1st of March 2023.

Administration

The Senate of the University of Colombo, governs the academic matters of the institute. The Board of Management and the Departmental Committee of the institute are the responsible for administrative and academic matters. The decision of the Senate will be final in all matters.

Academics

Undergraduate programs 

 BAMS (Bachelor of Ayurveda Medicine and Surgery) – Duration 6 years(Including 5 year Academic studies and 01 year Internship )
 BUMS (Bachelor of Unani Medicine and Surgery) – Duration 6 years(Including 5 year Academic studies and 01 year Internship )

Postgraduate programs 

  (Ayurveda)
 MD (AYU)- (Vachaspati)
 Postgraduate Diploma in Ayurveda
 Postgraduate Diploma in Unani

Publications 
The institute publishes the Sri Lanka Journal of Indigenous Medicine, a biannual peer-reviewed medical journal covering the traditional system of medicine, medicinal plants, Ayurvedic pharmaceutical science, etc.

See also
Sri Lankan traditional medicine
University of Colombo
Faculties and institutions of University of Colombo
Education in Sri Lanka
University Grants Commission (Sri Lanka)
Medical school
List of medical schools in Asia
Ayurveda
Alternative medicine
Traditional medicine
Charaka/Charaka Samhita
Sushurata/Sushruta Samhita

References
Plunkett, Richard; Ellemor, Brigitte (2003). Sri Lanka. Lonely Planet. pp. 174. 
Petitjean, Patrick; Jami, Catherine; Moulin, Anne + - Marie (1992). Science and Empires. Springer. pp. 112. 

Indigenous Medicine
Buildings and structures in Colombo
Ayurvedic colleges in Sri Lanka